Bukakata, sometimes spelled as Bukakkata, is a lakeside town in Masaka District, Central Uganda.

Location
The coordinates of the town are:00 18 18S, 32 02 24E (Latitude:-0.3050; Longitude:32.0400).

Population
The exact population of Bukakata is not known as of May 2011. In 2002 the National Population and Housing Census showed 6,226 children below the age of 18, of whom 23% were orphans.

Landmarks
The landmarks within the town limits or near the town include:

 The offices of Bukakkata Town Council
 Bukakkata Port - A landing site for the ferry that travels daily, between Bukakkata and Kalangala
 Bukakkata Central Market
 The headquarters of Bukakkata Sub-county, one of the administrative units of Masaka District Administration
 "Love in Action" - An NGO has a nursery/Primary and a Secondary School in Kasaka in Makonzi Parish. They also run a Grade 2 Health Clinic on the School premises providing health services for the School and local community.

External links
The Administrative Units of Masaka District

See also
 Masaka
 Masaka District
 Central Region, Uganda

References

Masaka District
Populated places in Central Region, Uganda
Cities in the Great Rift Valley